This is a list of the earliest railroads in North America, including various railroad-like precursors to the general modern form of a company or government agency operating locomotive-drawn trains on metal tracks.

Railroad-like entities (1700s–1810s) 
1720: A railroad was reportedly used in the construction of the French fortress in Louisbourg, Nova Scotia, Canada. 
1764: Between 1762 and 1764, at the close of the French and Indian War, a gravity railroad (mechanized tramway) (Montresor's Tramway) was built by British military engineers up the steep riverside terrain near the Niagara River waterfall's escarpment at the Niagara Portage, which the local Senecas called Crawl on All Fours, in Lewiston, New York.<ref
 name=PMat-text>Text online of placement commemorating  historic railroad., accessdate=2017-03-01</ref> Before the British conquest, under French control the portage had employed nearly 200 Seneca porters. However, once the British took control of the area, they installed a cable railway using sledges (heavy sleds without wheels) to hold the track between the rails. The sleds were capable of carrying 12 to 14 barrels at a time (a serious weight capacity even if only small shoulder-hoistable/mule-compatible keg-sized barrels, taken along with its longevity) indicating that it was a funicular design with two tracks. With barrels as the primary Up load's configuration and they also provided a ready-made counterweight with addition of sufficient Niagara River water as the likely mass used to adjust the lifting force. Designed by Captain John Montresor, the new railway replaced manual labor performed by the Seneca and touched off what might be the first labor rebellion in North America when the Seneca became unemployed; in September 1763, the Senecas revolted and killed many British soldiers and workers in what is called the Devil's Hole Massacre. The tramway was in use until the early 1800s
1799–1805: Boston developers began to reduce the height of Mount Vernon before building streets and homes. Silas Whitney constructed a gravity railroad to move excavated material down the hill to fill marshy areas to create new land from the Back Bay.<ref
 name=WMuir></ref> Frederick C. Gamst, a professor of anthropology at the University of Massachusetts, believed this to be the same railroad equipment as used by Bulfinch on his Beacon Hill railway, given the relations of both men to the land speculation syndicate.<ref
This excavation prepared a level area for the new State House of 1798, designed by the architect and construction engineer Charles Bulfinch."
</ref>
1809: A three-quarter-mile wooden tracked railway is built in Nether Providence Township, Pennsylvania by Thomas Leiper to deliver stone from his quarries to market.
 
 1810: The animal-powered Leiper Railroad followed after the preceding successful experiment – designed and built by merchant Thomas Leiper, the railway connects Crum Creek to Ridley Creek, in Delaware County, Pennsylvania. It was used until 1829, when it was temporarily replaced by the Leiper Canal, then is reopened to replace the canal in 1852. This became the Crum Creek Branch of the Baltimore and Philadelphia Railroad (part of the Baltimore and Ohio Railroad) in 1887. This is the first railroad meant to be permanent, and the first to evolve into trackage of a common carrier after an intervening closure.See the 1826 Granite Railway (pictured) for comparison.
1811: George Magers designed and built a  wooden gravity railroad between a gunpowder mill and its powder storage bunker at Falling's Creek, Virginia.
1815: New Jersey granted a charter on February 6, 1815, for a company to "erect a rail-road from the river Delaware near Trenton, to the river Raritan, at or near New Brunswick"—that is, to connect the water ports so boats could ferry riders the last distance connecting Philadelphia & Trenton to (19th-century) New York City and Brooklyn & Queens on Long Island via New York Harbor, as proposed by inventor and railway builder John Stevens (1749–1838). This New Jersey Railroad Company was the first passenger carrier railroad chartered in the United States, but failed to attract investors and was never built. Its rights would be passed to the Camden and Amboy Railroad (below),  chartered in 1830 and also having Stevens as president.
1816: A railroad was reportedly used at Kiskiminetas Creek, Pennsylvania.
1818: An iron-smelting furnace at Bear Creek, Armstrong County, Pennsylvania, reportedly had a wooden railroad in operation.

Early railroad companies (1820s–1830s) 
 Granite, coal and cotton railroads

1826: The Granite Railway in Massachusetts was incorporated by Thomas Handasyd Perkins and Gridley Bryant. Construction began on April 1, and operations began on October 7. It later became a branch of the Old Colony and Newport Railway, which was later absorbed into the New York, New Haven and Hartford Railroad. This is often called the first commercial railroad in the U.S., as it was the first to evolve into a common carrier without an intervening closure. See the 1810 Leiper Railroad for comparison.] </ref>
1831: The Mount Carbon Railroad was completed in 1831 running from Mount Carbon, Pennsylvania through Pottsville where it split into two branches, one going to what is now Seltzer and the other to the current Wadesville. This was a coal-hauling railroad,  in length.
1831: The Room Run Railroad was completed along the path of an unsuccessful gravity road, running a distance  from Nesquehoning to the Lehigh Canal loading docks at Mauch Chunk, Pennsylvania.
1831: The Chesterfield Railroad (sometimes called the Manchester Railroad) began operations by September 1831 in Chesterfield County, Virginia.
1839: Albion Railway serving coal mines around Stellarton, Nova Scotia, first railway in Canada to use iron rails and run year-round; home of Samson, the oldest surviving locomotive in Canada.

Early common carriers (1820s–1830s)
While private railroads are legally free to choose their jobs and customers, common carriers must charge fair rates to all comers.

Any effort to arrange early common-carrier railroads in chronological order must choose among various possible criterion dates, including applying for a state charter, receiving a charter, forming a company to build a railroad, beginning construction, opening operations, and so forth.

Selected railroads chartered since 1832:
1835: The New Orleans and Carrollton Railroad began operation after four years of work; rail route still in operation as the St. Charles Streetcar Line in New Orleans.
1836: The Lake Wimico and St. Joseph Canal and Railroad Company was the first steam railroad in Florida, opening on September 5.
1836: The Champlain and St. Lawrence Railroad opened in Quebec, Canada.
1838: The Northern Cross Railroad opens in Central Illinois; to this day, part of the NCR still operates under the Norfolk Southern Railway.

Tunnels and bridges

1829: Carrollton Viaduct built of stone for Baltimore & Ohio Railroad,  over Gwynns Falls River in Baltimore, Maryland
1831 Farnsworth Avenue Stone Arch Carriage Bridge over the Camden & Amboy RR. Bordentown NJ: First bridge completed over Stevens' newly-designed rolled iron inverted T-rails made in Wales. Today trains still pass under the arch on new rails of similar design. Roadway is still used above the stone arch. Designed by Wilson. Keystone date 1831. Made of Stockton Sandstone
1833 (June): The Staple Bend Tunnel, the first railroad tunnel in the U.S., completed in June 1833 as part of the Allegheny Portage Railroad which opened in March 1834. Trains stopped running through the Staple Bend Tunnel in 1857, and it is now part of the Allegheny Portage Railroad National Historic Site.
1833 (December): Wadesville Tunnel, built by Danville and Pottsville Railroad at Wadesville, Pennsylvania.
1835: Thomas Viaduct built of stone for Baltimore & Ohio Railroad,  over Patapsco River in Relay, Maryland
1835: Canton Viaduct built of stone for Boston & Providence Railroad, over Canton River in Canton, Massachusetts
1837: The Yorkville Tunnel opened on October 26, for the New York and Harlem Railroad. It was absorbed in the 1870s by the longer and wider Park Avenue Tunnel, and is used by all Metro-North Railroad commuter trains. The old tunnel carries the two center tracks, and two new tunnels carry outer tracks.
1837: The Taft Tunnel opened in 1837 for Norwich and Worcester Railroad in Lisbon, Connecticut, north of Norwich, Connecticut. This is the oldest tunnel still in use in its original form in the U.S.
1837: The Howard Tunnel in York County, Pennsylvania. Considered the second-oldest tunnel still in use in its original form in the U.S.
1848: Starrucca Viaduct built of stone for the Erie Railroad  over Starrucca Creek in Lanesboro, Pennsylvania
1850: The Henryton Tunnel on the Baltimore and Ohio Railroad.
1850: The Chetoogeta Mountain Tunnel on the Western and Atlantic Railroad, Tunnel Hill, Georgia. 1,477 feet long and the first major railroad tunnel in the south.
1856: The Blue Ridge Tunnel, considered a world marvel of engineering when opened.
 name=HautoNews>Lansford-Hauto tunnel called an engineering marvel, accessdate=2017-0301</ref> The tunnel allowed retirement and conversion of the famous Switchback Railroad (the Summit Hill & Mauch Chunk Railroad) into a tourism-only railroad owned by the Mauch Chunk, Summit Hill Switch-Back Railway Company

West of the Mississippi River
1841: The Red River Railroad between Alexandria and Cheneyville in Louisiana was operational by 1841.
1852: The first section of the Pacific Railroad, later part of the Missouri Pacific Railroad, opened near St. Louis, Missouri.

Notes

See also

History of rail transport in Canada
History of rail transport in the United States
Rail transport in Mexico#History

References

External links
First Railway (Tramway) Built in America, Lewiston, NY, 1764
American Railroads; Their Growth and Development by Association of American Railroads (Washington DC, 1956)
Library of Congress - History of Railroads and Maps
Railroad History Database
 National Railway Historical Society (NRHS): Historical Almanac of American Railroads - US, Canada, Mexico
The Case of the Vanishing Locomotive, Robert Thayer, American Heritage, October 1998, Volume 49, Issue 6

Specific railroads
First Permanent Railroad In The U. S. And Its Connection To The University Of Pennsylvania in Philadelphia. (Leiper Railroad)
The First Railroad in America 1826-1926: A History of the Origin and Development of the Granite Railway at Quincy, Massachusetts. (Granite Railroad)

Rail transportation in North America
Rail transport in Canada
History of rail transportation in the United States
Railroads, oldest
Oldest things